Parliamentary elections were held in Cameroon on 24 April 1964. They were the first elections held after Southern Cameroons (also known as West Cameroon) became part of the country in 1961. The result was a victory for the Cameroonian Union (UC), which won 40 of the 50 seats. The UC and the Cameroonian Party of Democrats only contested the 40 seats East Cameroon, while the Kamerun National Democratic Party and Cameroon People's National Convention contested the ten seats in West Cameroon. The elections were marred by severe irregularities.

Results

References

Cameroon
Parliamentary election
Elections in Cameroon
Election and referendum articles with incomplete results
Cameroonian parliamentary election